Innerleithen railway station served the town of Innerleithen, Scottish Borders, Scotland from 1864 to 1962 on the Peebles Railway.

History 
The station opened on 1 October 1864 by the Peebles Railway. The station was situated on the east side of Traquair Road on the B709. This station was the terminus for two years until the line was extended to Galashiels on 18 June 1866. The moderate sized goods yard consisted of four sidings and a loop giving access from both directions. One of the sidings passed a cattle dock and ran into a brick-built good shed. There were pens in the northwest corner of the yard. There were three further short sidings on the down side of the line. The station initially had one platform, but a second was built in the early 19th century. Some changes were made to the goods yard, including the loop being removed and relaid as a siding running behind the up platform and access was only from the east. Waverley Mills was provided with a private siding from the goods yard. The station was closed to both passengers and goods traffic on 5 February 1962.

References

External links 

Disused railway stations in the Scottish Borders
Former North British Railway stations
Railway stations in Great Britain opened in 1864
Railway stations in Great Britain closed in 1962
1864 establishments in Scotland
1962 disestablishments in Scotland
Innerleithen